This is a list of diplomatic missions in Russia. As the world's largest country, and a major great power, as well as a potential superpower, the Russian Federation is a permanent member of the United Nations Security Council. Russia is the successor state to the Soviet Union, and hosts a large diplomatic community in its capital city of Moscow. Moscow hosts 147 embassies, with numerous countries maintaining consulates general and consulates throughout the country.

Diplomatic missions in Russia

Embassies in Moscow

Consulates in Saint Petersburg

Consulates in Yekaterinburg

Consulates in remainder of Russia

Other missions 
  (Permanent Representation)
  (Delegation)
  (Interests Section in Swiss Embassy)
  (Representative Office)
  (Delegation)
  (Representative Office)

Closed missions

Non-Resident Embassies 

Resident in Berlin, Germany
 
 
 
 
  
 
 
 

Resident in Brussels, Belgium
  
 
 
  
  
  
  
 

Resident in London, United Kingdom
  
 
 
 
  
 
 

Resident in Tokyo, Japan
 
 
 
 

Resident in elsewhere
  (Stockholm)
  (Geneva)
  (The Hague)

States with no relations

See also
 Ministry of Foreign Affairs of Russia
 Foreign minister of Russia
 Foreign relations of Russia
 List of Russian diplomats
 Diplomatic missions of Russia
 Visa requirements for Russian citizens
 Russian Foreign Services

Notes

References

External links
 Diplomatic missions resident in the Russian Federation
 Diplomat, A Monthly for Foreigners About Russians, for Russians About Foreigners
Contact information and map of foreign Embassies & Consulates in Russia

 
Diplomatic missions
Russia